"Keep Smiling" is a song performed by British pop duo Bars and Melody. The song was released in the United Kingdom as a digital download on 16 February 2015 as the second single from their debut studio album 143 (2015). The song peaked at number 52 on the UK Singles Chart.

Music video
A music video to accompany the release of "Keep Smiling" was first released onto YouTube on 9 February 2015 at a total length of three minutes and four seconds. The video was directed by Ryan Mackfall and produced by Crashburn Media.

Track listing

Charts

Weekly charts

Release history

References

2015 songs
2015 singles
143 Records singles